F&C Asset Management Plc was an international asset management company. It was acquired by Bank of Montreal in 2014. Its head office was in the City of London in Exchange House, Primrose Street, London.

History
F&C Asset Management was established in 1972, to take over the management of the Foreign & Colonial Investment Trust. HypoVereinsbank took a 50% stake in the company in 1989, increasing it to 90% in 1998. Eureko acquired HypoVereinsbank's stake in 2000 and acquired the remaining 10% (which had been held by Foreign & Colonial Investment Trust) in 2001.

F&C Asset Management retained the F&C brand for the enlarged business when it merged with Isis Asset Management in 2004. The enlarged business was then owned jointly by Eureko and Friends Provident (which had been the majority shareholder in Isis) although, after F&C Asset Management listed on the London Stock Exchange, Eureko divested much of its holding in 2007, and Friends Provident divested its holding in 2009.

F&C Asset Management was the official sponsor of Birmingham City F.C. between 2007 and 2011.

In 2014, F&C Asset Management was acquired by Bank of Montreal in deal worth £697 million, and then rebranded as BMO Global Asset Management.

References

Further reading
F&C – A History of Foreign & Colonial Investment Trust by Neil McKendrick and John Newlands, 1999.

Investment management companies of the United Kingdom
Alternative investment management companies
Financial services companies based in the City of London
Financial services companies established in 1972
1972 establishments in England
2014 mergers and acquisitions
Bank of Montreal
British subsidiaries of foreign companies